The Duisburg Stadtbahn is a light rail network forming part of the larger Rhine-Ruhr Stadtbahn system.  It is the centrepiece of the public transport system in Duisburg, a city in the federal state of North Rhine-Westphalia, Germany.

Lines

History 

It was planned to build a light railway system for the most important lines, which crosses the city centre from west to east. This route was chosen, because it was the best way for the line from Mülheim an der Ruhr to Moers to run through Duisburg. But also for the line to Düsseldorf light railway tracks were planned. When the construction of Stadtbahn began, the route southwards to Düsseldorf was built first. And also the first tunnel, that was just 800 m long, was built on that line in 1970, so that four years later, in 1974, construction of the route could begin. However a failure was, that Angerbogen light railway station was built for 10.5 million €, but it would never open, as the new district that was planned to be built there, was not put up as big as it had to become for such a big station.

In 1992 city tunnel was opened for trams. So many lines got another route, which was not shorter and faster in every case. For example, the line to Düsseldorf now has to run westwards south of city centre before it gets in tunnel and runs eastwards back. In 2000 the tunnel was extended to Meiderich Bf..

Changed numbers and routes 

That time also some numbers and routes of lines were changed:

→ For history before construction of the Stadtbahn began, look at Trams in Duisburg.

References

External links

 Duisburger Verkehrsgesellschaft  – official site
 

Light rail in Germany
Underground rapid transit in Germany
Tram transport in Germany
Stadtbahn